The Laurence Olivier Award for Society of London Theatre Special Award is an annual award presented by the Society of London Theatre in recognition of achievements in commercial British theatre. The awards were established as the Society of West End Theatre Awards in 1976, and renamed in 1984 in honour of English actor and director Laurence Olivier, himself a 1979 recipient of this award.

This award was introduced in 1976. In 2020, the award was expanded with additional Special Recognition Recipients, recognizing a larger number of people each year for their lifetime of contributions to commercial British theatre.

Award winners

1970s

1980s

1990s

2000s

2010s

2020s

See also
 Special Tony Award

References

External links
 

1976 establishments in the United Kingdom
Awards established in 1976
Laurence Olivier Awards
Lifetime achievement awards